State elections were held in South Australia on 11 October 1997. All 47 seats in the South Australian House of Assembly were up for election. The incumbent Liberal Party of Australia led by Premier of South Australia John Olsen defeated the Australian Labor Party led by Leader of the Opposition Mike Rann, forming a minority government with the SA Nationals and independent MPs.

Background
Following the 1993 landslide to the Liberals, ending 11 years of Labor government, Labor now led by Mike Rann held just 11 seats in the House of Assembly. The Liberals held 36 seats and there were no independent or minor party members in the House of Assembly. They had held a record 37, but lost one at the 1994 Torrens by-election. However the Liberals were suffering from heightened internal tensions.  Premier Dean Brown had been toppled by Industry Minister and factional rival John Olsen in a 1996 party-room coup.  Olsen had been in office for just over 10 months on election day.

Key dates
 Issue of writ: 13 September 1997
 Close of electoral rolls: 22 September 1997
 Close of nominations: Friday 26 September 1997, at noon
 Polling day: 11 October 1997
 Return of writ: On or before 14 November 1997 (actually returned 7 November)

Results

House of Assembly

 

|}

Seats changing hands

 Members in italics did not recontest their seats.
 In addition, Labor retained the seat of Torrens, which it had gained from the Liberals at the 1994 by-election.

Labor needed a 13-seat swing to make Rann premier, a deficit thought insurmountable before the election. However, to the surprise of most observers, Olsen lost the massive majority he'd inherited from Brown.  Labor polled exceptionally well, regaining much of what it had lost in its severe defeat of four years earlier.  Indeed, on election night many Liberal observers feared that Labor had managed the swing it needed to regain government.  Ultimately, Labor picked up 10 seats, three seats short of victory. The Liberals lost a massive 13 seats: 10 to Labor, 1 to the Nationals, and 2 to conservative independents. Labor received a record two-party swing of 9.4 percent, as opposed to the previous record of 8.9 percent to the Liberals at the last election. Olsen was forced to seek the support of the Nationals and the independents to stay in office at the helm of a minority government.

The Liberals briefly regained a majority when Mitch Williams rejoined the Liberal Party in 1999, but lost it again in 2000 when it expelled Peter Lewis from the party in 2000, and Bob Such resigned from the Liberal Party later in 2000. However they continued to govern with the support of the Nationals and independents until the 2002 election.

Legislative Council

|}

In the Legislative Council, the Australian Democrats won two seats for the first time. Elected were 4 Liberal, 4 Labor, 2 Australian Democrats, and No Pokies candidate Nick Xenophon. Carrying over from the 1993 election were 6 Liberal, 4 Labor, 1 Democrat, leaving total numbers at 10 Liberal, 8 Labor, 3 Democrats, 1 No Pokies.

The election was notable for the Australian Democrats' strongest performance in South Australia, winning two Legislative Council seats at an election for the only time in their history (though their predecessors, the Liberal Movement (LM), had won two Legislative Council seats on a higher primary vote in the 1975 election). The Democrats also finished second after preferences in seven House of Assembly seats (compared to three for the LM in 1975). However, it marked the peak for Democrats' influence in South Australia. From here on they would slowly lose numbers and influence, winning only one more seat (in 2002), and losing their remaining parliamentary representation as of the 2010 election.

Labor Upper House members Terry Cameron and Trevor Crothers would resign from the party in 1998 and 1999 respectively, to support the Liberals over the privatisation of ETSA. This also meant the Democrats lost sole balance of power for the first time since 1985.

Post-election pendulum

Legacy
The 1997 result put Labor within striking distance of winning government at the next election in 2002.  John Olsen was left with internal disquiet over the leadership challenge and poor election result while his opponent, Mike Rann, was seen to have 'won' the campaign despite losing the election.

On 6 February 2007, Mike Rann told parliament that some in the Liberal party had leaked information to him before and during the election campaign. The following quote by Rann is from Hansard on 6/2/2007 :

"You asked me a question and I will give you a 55-minute answer, because you will remember one day when I came into this place and I had, I think, 880 pages of cabinet and other documents... I remember being telephoned and told to go to a certain cafe, not in a white car but in a taxi, and then to walk in a zigzag fashion through the streets of a suburb, where I was to be handed cabinet documents. So much for their cabinet solidarity and cabinet confidentiality! There was a queue on the telephone telling us what had happened the day before. It was the same during the 1997 election campaign. People thought, 'How does this guy (the leader of the opposition at the time) know intuitively exactly what John Olsen is doing the next day?' It was because I was being phoned and told! So, do not talk to me about cabinet solidarity lest I come in here and start naming names, which will set off another generation of disputation on the other side of the house. Anyway, cabinet approved, among other things, on 20 December 2006 minister Lomax-Smith's proposed statement and approved her to announce publicly that she opposed the proposal in cabinet. She did so because we agreed that she should be able to do so. Somehow I do not think that John Olsen agreed to what happened when I was getting the phone call at 6 o'clock in the morning and at midnight, and walking in a zigzag pattern through suburbs to be handed a cabinet bag and cabinet documents. We have a different approach. We agreed to it. It was a cabinet decision to agree to it. So, please, ask me some more questions, because there were two different camps involved in this leaking to the then poor unpopular leader of the opposition, and I am more than happy to name names."

See also
 Candidates of the South Australian state election, 1997
 Members of the South Australian House of Assembly, 1997-2002
 Members of the South Australian Legislative Council, 1997-2002
 Results of the South Australian state election, 1997 (House of Assembly)
 Results of the 1997 South Australian state election (Legislative Council)

References
 1997 election maps and results: Antony Green ABC archive
History of South Australian elections 1857–2006, volume 1: ECSA

Political parties
Australian Labor Party
Liberal Party of Australia
Australian Greens
Australian Democrats
The Nationals

Specific

1997 elections in Australia
Elections in South Australia
1990s in South Australia
October 1997 events in Australia